Lambertian reflectance is the property that defines an ideal "matte" or diffusely reflecting surface. The apparent brightness of a Lambertian surface to an observer is the same regardless of the observer's angle of view. More technically, the surface's luminance is isotropic, and the luminous intensity obeys Lambert's cosine law. Lambertian reflectance is named after Johann Heinrich Lambert, who introduced the concept of perfect diffusion in his 1760 book Photometria.

Examples
Unfinished wood exhibits roughly Lambertian reflectance, but wood finished with a glossy coat of polyurethane does not, since the glossy coating creates specular highlights. Though not all rough surfaces are Lambertian, this is often a good approximation, and is frequently used when the characteristics of the surface are unknown.

Spectralon is a material which is designed to exhibit an almost perfect Lambertian reflectance.

Use in computer graphics

In computer graphics, Lambertian reflection is often used as a model for diffuse reflection. This technique causes all closed polygons (such as a triangle within a 3D mesh) to reflect light equally in all directions when rendered. The reflection decreases when the surface is tilted away from being perpendicular to the light source, however, because the area is illuminated by a smaller fraction of the incident radiation.

The reflection is calculated by taking the dot product of the surface's unit normal vector, and a normalized light-direction vector, pointing from the surface to the light source. This number is then multiplied by the color of the surface and the intensity of the light hitting the surface:

,

Because

,

where  is the angle between the directions of the two vectors, the brightness will be highest if the surface is perpendicular to the light vector, and lowest if the light vector intersects the surface at a grazing angle.

Lambertian reflection from polished surfaces is typically accompanied by specular reflection (gloss), where the surface luminance is highest when the observer is situated at the perfect reflection direction (i.e. where the direction of the reflected light is a reflection of the direction of the incident light in the surface), and falls off sharply.

Other waves

While Lambertian reflectance usually refers to the reflection of light by an object, it can be used to refer to the reflection of any wave.  For example, in ultrasound imaging, "rough" tissues are said to exhibit Lambertian reflectance.

See also
 List of common shading algorithms
 Gamma correction

References

Radiometry
Photometry
Scattering, absorption and radiative transfer (optics)
Shading